Arbon is a city in the canton of Thurgau in Switzerland.

Arbon may also refer to:

 Arbon (district), in Switzerland
 Arbon, Haute-Garonne, French commune
 Arbon, Idaho
 Arbon Valley, Idaho